The Kazan School of phonology was an influential group of linguists in Kazan. The linguistic circle included the Polish linguist Jan Baudouin de Courtenay and his student Nikolai Trubetzkoy. Mikołaj Kruszewski, Vasilii Alekseevich Bogoroditskii, Sergeĭ Konstantinovich Bulich, and Aleksandr Ivanovic Aleksandrov are usually considered members. Baudouin de Courtenay was the most prominent figure, but Kruszewski was also a significant factor in the movement, but died early, and was then frequently denigrated by Baudouin de Courtenay. The Kazan school influenced the Prague school.

Many of the ideas often attributed to Saussure were already present in work by the Kazan school, which Saussure was aware of. However, work in the Kazan School did not have a wide impact and was not very accessible, but was known by Roman Jakobson.

An aim of the Kazan School was to provide a theory of language, and make linguistics explanatory. Some terminology created in the school was Kruszewski's distinction of two types of 'association': association by simultaneity or parallelism, and association by sequence or juxtaposition - corresponding to Saussure's distinction between paradigmatic and syntagmatic relations. Baudouin de Courtenay distinguished between anthropophonics, equivalent to modern-day phonetics, and psychophonetics, more like modern-day phonology but including the study of sounds as relating to morphology. Baudouin de Courtenay used the notion of phoneme from Saussure's historical work, but cast it in synchronic terms to use it in his description of the psychophonetics. This marked the development from a focus on the relationships between different phones, to a phoneme with its own representation - and invariant form - instead of a set of rules between variant forms.

Members
 Jan Baudouin de Courtenay
 Nikolai Trubetzkoy
 Mikołaj Kruszewski
 Vasily Alekseevich Bogoroditsky
 Sergey Konstantinovich Bulich
 Aleksandr Ivanovic Aleksandrov

References

Resources
 Roman Jakobson, “The Kazan school of Polish linguistics and its place in the international development of phonology”, Roman Jakobson: Selected Writings, vol. II: Word and Language. The Hague: Mouton, 1972.
 J. Radwańska-Williams, “Examining our patrimony: The case of the Kazan School”, Historigraphia Linguistica 33 (2006): 357–90.

Schools of linguistics
Kazan